Huntsville Museum of Art (HMA) is a museum located in Huntsville, Alabama.  HMA sits in Big Spring Park within Downtown Huntsville, and serves as a magnet for cultural activities.

In 1957, the Huntsville Art League and Museum Association (HALMA) was formed with the goal of growing the arts community within Huntsville and of one day having a museum. HMA was officially established by the City of Huntsville with city Ordinance No. 70-134, on August 13, 1970, which established the Museum Board of the City of Huntsville.  The museum held its first exhibition in 1973 and moved to its first permanent facility at the Von Braun Center in 1975, while the rest of HALMA had to relocate to Heart of Huntsville Mall. In 1989, HALMA officially split with the museum retaining the name Huntsville Museum of Art while the rest of the organization was known as Huntsville Art League (HAL). HMA moved to its present building at Big Spring Park in March 1998 and housed seven galleries.

The museum expanded in 2010 with the Davidson Center, which includes seven new exhibition galleries, the Stender Family Education Galleries, four special event facilities, and an adjacent parking lot. The museum's 75,034 square foot facility now includes fourteen galleries covering 20,000 square feet.

Numerous meeting and event spaces are available throughout the museum to accommodate weddings, receptions, meetings and other events.  The entire complex is designed to integrate interior and exterior spaces and serve as a tangible focal point for quality of life and economic development benefiting the entire Huntsville/Madison County area. The museum is fully handicap accessible.  The museum is a member of the North American Reciprocal Museums program.

Mission Statement:

The Huntsville Museum of Art is a non-profit municipal corporation established by the City of Huntsville, Alabama, and governed by a city-appointed Museum Board. The museum seeks to foster understanding of the visual arts and appreciation of artistic achievement. The mission of the museum is to bring people and art together through acquiring, preserving, exhibiting and interpreting the highest quality works of art.

Programs:

The museum maintains an active, engaging schedule of exhibitions and programs through its permanent collections and special exhibitions.  The Voices of Our Times series brings people of note in the arts, academia, publishing and politics to the Huntsville Museum of Art for in-depth discussions and presentations.  The Family Programs offer fun, interactive art making activities for families with children ages three and up.  In the Museum Academy, art classes are offered weekdays and Saturdays for children ages three and up.  High School and adult art classes and workshops are also available.

Honors & Achievements: 
 The museum was first accredited by The American Alliance of Museums in 1980 and re-accredited with distinction in 1989, 2004, and 2020.
 Named as one of Alabama's "Top 10" destinations by the Alabama Bureau of Tourism and Travel.
 The only public collection of paintings, drawings, sculptures and crafts in the area with over 3,000 pieces in its permanent collection.
 Voted "Best of Bama" by Alabama Magazine for the Best Art Museum in 2014, 2015, 2016, 2018, 2019, and 2022.

Collection 
Permanent Collection:

The permanent collection of the Huntsville Museum of Art comprises over 3,000 objects; it is focused primarily on 19th and 20th century American art with an emphasis on art from the Southeast. African, Asian, and European art, from cultures influential on American art, is the museum's secondary collecting focus. The collection holds some 400 works on paper by American artists such as James McNeill Whistler, Reginald Marsh, John Sloan, Robert Rauschenberg, Frank Stella, and Andy Warhol. These works have allowed the museum to provide its community first-hand access to original works of art by leading 20th century masters.

The museum has also acquired works which are of particular importance to Huntsville and its scientific community, such as a group of watercolors of Huntsville and the Marshall Space Flight Center by Renato Moncini, who worked for NASA as an illustrator in the Apollo program. Another work is the  Moonwalk by Andy Warhol. There are also European and Japanese prints, Chinese glassware and African sculptures. The museum is also famous for its collection of animal figures made from silver, the largest in the world, and the Italian jewelry produced by Gianmaria Buccellati.

Since 1998, nearly 70 contemporary works in wood, glass, metal, clay and fiber have been added to the collection, including works by Dale Chihuly, William Morris and Philip Moulthrop. In 2008, the museum acquired the prestigious Sellars Collection of Art by American Women, a landmark gathering of over 400 paintings, drawings and sculptures that heralds achievements of more than 250 American women artists active between 1850 and 1940. An eclectic holding of more than 600 works in various media form the remainder of the collection, such as the unique assembly of sterling silver animals created by the luxury Italian jewelry firm of Buccellati; European and Japanese prints; Chinese snuff bottles; carved African objects; and other valuable community resources that affirm that artistic heritage and provide context for American achievements in the arts.

In 2017, the museum acquired the historic Portrait of Ethel Waters, created by well-known artist, Luigi Lucioni.  HMA Executive Director, Christopher J. Madkour, and Luigi Lucioni Historian, Dr. Stuart Embury, heard of the painting and began taking measures to track down its whereabouts.  When the two traced it to a private residence in 2016, they learned the family had plans to auction the painting off in the coming months. The owner graciously allowed the Huntsville Museum of Art to display Ethel Waters in the exhibition, American Romantic: The Art of Luigi Lucioni, where it was viewed by the public for the first time since 1942. The museum successfully negotiated the purchase of Portrait of Ethel Waters and, thanks in large part to the generosity of the Huntsville community, Lucioni's Portrait of Ethel Waters now has a new home at the Huntsville Museum of Art where it will be made accessible for public viewing.

Collections for Travel:

The Huntsville Museum of Art has five collections available for travel: Rebels with a Cause, John James Audubon: The Viviparous Quadrupeds of North America, Vietnam: The Real War, Will Henry Stevens: Naturalist/Modernist, and 9/11 and Beyond: Photographs from The Associated Press. 

Rebels With a Cause presents outstanding selections of painting, drawings and sculptures from The Huntsville Museum of Art's recently acquired Sellars Collection of Art by American Women. This landmark holding celebrates the achievements of over 250 talented female artists active between the mid-19th and mid-20th centuries. Many rebelled against the convention of their day by exhibiting alongside their male counterparts, receiving awards, and pioneering the way for those who would follow. Today, art historians are rediscovering their accomplishments and establishing their rightful place in the expanding narrative of American history.

John James Audubon: The Viviparous Quadrupeds of North America presents 36 original large-format Audubon prints from the private collection of Mr. & Mrs. William H. Told, Jr. of New York. The Told's collected these prints for nearly four decades, having received their first — a marmot — as a gift. They appreciated the scientifically accurate animal subjects (some of which are now extinct) as well as the beautifully detailed backgrounds that often included native foliage and other naturalistic details. The Tolds have graciously donated their impressive collection to the Huntsville Museum of Art.

Vietnam: The Real War contains images that both recorded and changed history. To cover the War, The Associated Press gathered an extraordinary group of superb photojournalists in its Saigon bureau, creating one of the greatest photographic legacies of the 20th century.

Will Henry Stevens: Naturalist/Modernist presents the work of American artist Will Henry Stevens (1881-1949), a lifelong naturalist and important modernist painter known for his two distinct artistic styles: Representational Naturalism and Southern Modernism. Stevens clearly separated his two bodies of work, exhibiting his rural Southern landscapes and his non-objective abstractions at different galleries. Though seemingly disconnected, his individual styles are part of a larger whole. Each style was born from the soul of an artist strongly influenced by his reverence for the Southern landscape.

9/11 and Beyond: Photographs from The Associated Press looks back at the World Trade Center's construction, destruction and slow reemergence through 50 hand-selected photographs from the archives of The Associated Press for the 20th anniversary of the attacks.

References

External links 
 Museum website

Museums in Huntsville, Alabama
Art museums and galleries in Alabama
Art museums established in 1970
1970 establishments in Alabama